Acanthite is a form of silver sulfide with the chemical formula Ag2S. It crystallizes in the monoclinic system and is the stable form of silver sulfide below . Argentite is the stable form above that temperature. As argentite cools below that temperature its cubic form is distorted to the monoclinic form of acanthite. Below 173 °C acanthite forms directly. Acanthite is the only stable form  in normal air temperature.

Occurrence
Acanthite is a common silver mineral in moderately low-temperature hydrothermal 
veins and in zones of supergene enrichment. It occurs in association with native silver, pyrargyrite, proustite, polybasite, stephanite, aguilarite, galena,
chalcopyrite, sphalerite, calcite and quartz.

Acanthite was first described in 1855 for an occurrence in the Jáchymov (St Joachimsthal) District, Krušné Hory Mts (Erzgebirge), Karlovy Vary Region, Bohemia, Czech Republic. The name is from the Greek "akantha" meaning thorn or arrow, in reference to its crystal shape.

Gallery

See also
 List of minerals

References

Sulfide minerals
Silver minerals
Monoclinic minerals
Minerals in space group 14